Strzyżowiec may refer to the following places in Poland:
Strzyżowiec, Lower Silesian Voivodeship (south-west Poland)
Strzyżowiec, Lublin Voivodeship (east Poland)